Beka Lomtadze (born November 23, 1991) is a Georgian freestyle wrestler competing in the 61 kg division. Lomtadze began wrestling at the age of 13 in his home country of Georgia.  He won gold medal in 2019 world championships in Nur-Sultan and silver 2016 world championships in Budapest.

He competed in the 65kg event at the 2022 World Wrestling Championships held in Belgrade, Serbia.

References

External links
 

1991 births
People from Kutaisi
Male sport wrestlers from Georgia (country)
World Wrestling Championships medalists
Living people
European Games silver medalists for Georgia (country)
European Games medalists in wrestling
Wrestlers at the 2015 European Games
European Wrestling Championships medalists
21st-century people from Georgia (country)
World Wrestling Champions